Fordham Preparatory School (also known as Fordham Prep) is an American private, Jesuit, boys' college-preparatory school located on the Rose Hill campus of Fordham University in the Bronx, New York City.

From its founding in 1841 until 1970, the school was under the direction of the University.

History

Fordham Preparatory School was established in 1841 by bishop John Hughes, later Archbishop of New York, as the Second Division of St. John's College, on the Feast of St. John the Baptist. In 1846, the Society of Jesus was chosen to preside over the institution. The Second Division's curriculum consisted of four years of study in Latin, Greek, grammar, literature, history, geography, mathematics and religion, followed by three years of study in the First Division (equivalent to present-day Fordham University). The degree of Artium Baccalaureus was awarded for completion of both curricula. The Second Division was a boarding school from its founding until 1920, when it ceased boarding operations and assumed its present form as a day school. St. John's College was re-chartered under its current name of Fordham University in 1907, and the school officially became known as Fordham Preparatory School in 1937, having been unofficially known as "Fordham Prep" for some years prior. In 1970, Fordham Preparatory School formally separated from the University, establishing itself as an independent preparatory school with its own administration, endowment, and Board of Trustees.

Fordham Preparatory School was originally housed in a wing of the Fordham University Administration Building, since demolished. In 1890, the school was relocated to the recently-constructed Hughes Hall, originally called Second Division Hall or Junior Hall. Hughes Hall now houses the Fordham University Gabelli School of Business. After formally separating with the University, the Prep moved to then-new Shea Hall in 1972, erected on what were once fields at the northwestern corner of the campus. Rising construction costs, coupled with the recent separation from the University, brought the Prep into poor financial standing by the early 1970s. Generous donations by alumni, including those of aerosol-valve inventor and 1939 alumnus Robert Abplanalp, and a series of benefit concerts given by entertainers such as Bing Crosby and Bob Hope, were instrumental in funding the expansion to Shea Hall. By the end of the decade, however, the school still remained burdened by the immensity of its debt, which was subsequently reduced after the failure of its mortgage-holder, Franklin National Bank, and a compromise bartered by 1929 alumnus and former Governor of New York Malcolm Wilson. A second building, Maloney Hall, was completed in 1991 to form the present iteration of the Prep grounds.

Academics

Fordham Preparatory School instructs students in a classical liberal arts curriculum, in the disciplines of classical languages, English, history, mathematics, modern languages, science, theology, and fine arts. Students are given the option to study Latin or Ancient Greek freshman year, after which they may also begin studying French, German, Italian, Mandarin Chinese, or Spanish. Most subjects typically require four years of study.

There are twenty-four Advanced Placement courses offered, in addition to a variety of advanced courses in other disciplines. Certain students are also invited to take courses at Fordham University.

The Leonard Theatre 
Constructed in 1991 as part of the Maloney Hall addition, The Leonard Theatre is a one-thousand seat performing arts venue. In addition to hosting Fordham Prep Dramatic Society productions and other performances and assemblies, the theatre has hosted the MSNBC news program Hardball with Chris Matthews twice, and Irish tenor Ronan Tynan in concert.

Administration

Presidents 
(Since creation of position in 1975.)

 Rev. Eugene O'Brien, SJ (1975–1980)
 Rev. Edward Maloney, SJ (1980–1996)
 Rev. Joseph Parkes, SJ (1996–2004)
 Rev. Kenneth Boller, SJ (2004–2013)
 Rev. Christopher J. Devron, SJ (2013–2022)
 Mr. Brian Carney (Interim President, 2022-2023)
 Mr. Anthony Day (Assumes post in 2023)

Headmasters/Principals 
(Since separation from the university in 1970.)

Title changed from headmaster to principal in 1999.

 Rev. Eugene O'Brien, SJ (1960–1975)
 Dr. Bernard Bouillette, PhD (1975–1982)
 Dr. Cornelius F. McCarthy, PhD '53 (1982–1994)
 Mr. Robert Gomprecht '65 (1994–2016) 
 Dr. Joseph Petriello, PhD '98 (2016– )

Athletics 
The school has teams that participate in eighteen different sports, with forty teams altogether. The athletic facilities include Fordham Prep's own playing fields and running track, the University's adjacent fields and tennis courts, and some other facilities, such as the boathouse located in nearby New Rochelle.

Autumn 
 Baseball (autumn varsity)
 Bowling (varsity)
 Crew (freshmen, lightweight, junior varsity, varsity)
 Cross country (freshmen, varsity)
 Football (freshmen, junior varsity, varsity)
 Swimming and diving (freshmen only)

Winter 
 Basketball (freshmen, junior varsity, varsity)
 Ice hockey (junior varsity, varsity)
 Squash (varsity)
 Swimming and diving (varsity only)
 Indoor track and field (freshmen, junior varsity, varsity)
 Wrestling (junior varsity, varsity)

Spring 
 Baseball (freshmen, junior varsity, varsity)
 Crew (freshmen, lightweight, junior varsity, varsity)
 Golf (varsity)
 Lacrosse (junior varsity, varsity)
 Rugby (junior varsity, varsity)
 Tennis (junior varsity, varsity)
 Track and field (freshmen, junior varsity, varsity)
 Volleyball (varsity)

Notable alumni
 Robert Abplanalp (1939) – inventor of the aerosol valve; founder of the Precision Valve Corporation  
 Joseph Bastianich (1985) – winemaker; restaurateur; judge on the television series MasterChef  
 Emil Bavasi (1932) - baseball executive
 Martin Beck (1918) - former professional football player
 Esteban Bellan (1868) – first Latin American professional baseball player 
 Thomas V. Bermingham, S.J. (1936) - scholar, professor at Georgetown University, actor
 Loring M. Black (1903) - lawyer and United States Congressman 
 Matthew W. Brennan (1915) - former professional football player 
 John M. Cunningham (1914) - lawyer and politician
 Leonard Curreri (1979) - actor and musician
 Arthur Daley (1922) – The New York Times sports columnist; Pulitzer Prize winner for journalism 
 Rev. Patrick F. Dealy, SJ (1846)– 11th President of Fordham University, 1882–1885 
 Carmine DeSapio (1927) - Secretary of State of New York 1955–1959; Grand Sachem of Tammany Hall 1954–1961 
 Joseph J. DioGuardi (1958) – U.S. Congressman 
 Jorge I. Domínguez (1963) - scholar and professor, Harvard University 
 Richard Foerster (1967) - poet 
 Pete Fornatale (1963) – disk jockey; music historian
 Fred Frick (1934) - son of Major League Baseball commissioner Ford C. Frick
 Frankie Frisch (1916) – Major League Baseball Hall of Famer; known as "The Fordham Flash" 
 Mario Gabelli (1961) – CEO and founder of Gabelli Asset Management Company
 Edward J. Glennon (1901) - Bronx County District Attorney and New York State Supreme Court Judge
 Anthony Guida (1959) - television and radio personality
 J. Hunter Guthrie (1917) – Jesuit philosopher; president of Georgetown University
 Robert Hackett (1977) – silver medalist in Swimming at the 1976 Summer Olympics
 John J. Halligan, SJ (1947) - humanitarian, founder of the Working Boy Center in Quito
 John Halligan (1959) – New York Rangers public relations director; NHL executive 
 Desmond Harrington (1994) - actor
 Kenneth Hoffman (1961)  - former president, Hart Schaffner Marx
 Myles Hogan (2022) - Nike Outdoor Nationals High School 2 Mile National Champion 
 John Holland (2006) – professional basketball player
 George Jackson (1976) – movie producer, known for New Jack City, House Party 2, and A Thin Line Between Love and Hate
 James G. Kane (1944) - banking executive, Peoples Westchester Savings Bank
 Walter P. Kellenberg (1919) – Bishop of Rockville Center
 Walter Kinsella (1917) – actor
 Joseph E. Kinsley (1914) - lawyer and politician
 William Kuntz (1968) –  United States District Judge for the United States District Court for the Eastern District of New York
 John L. Lahey (1964) – president of Quinnipiac University
 John La Farge (1852) – artist;  stained-glass innovator 
 Thomas F. Leahy (1955) - former president of the CBS television network
 John Liscio (1967) - financial analyst and journalist
 John F. Loughran (1950) - senior officer of J.P. Morgan & Co. in Japan
 Walter A. Lynch (1911) - congressman from 22nd District of New York, 1940-1951; 1950 nominee for Governor of New York
 Gerald W. Lynch (1954) - former president of John Jay College of Criminal Justice
 Juan Tomas Macmanus (1867) - banker, Senator in Mexico from Chihuahua
 William P. Magee Jr. (1962) – surgeon; founder of Operation Smile non-profit
 Francis J. McCaffrey (1935) - lawyer and politician
 Theodore Edgar McCarrick (1949) – former Archbishop of Washington  
 Horace McKenna, S.J. (1916) – founder of S.O.M.E. (So Others Might Eat); advocate of the Sursum Corda Cooperative
 Martin T. McMahon (1855) - Union Army officer, politician, and ambassador to Paraguay
 Ryan Meara (2008) - professional soccer player
 Larry Miggins (1943) - former professional baseball player
 John Purroy Mitchel (1894) –  95th Mayor of New York City 
 Colman Mockler (1947) – CEO of the Gillette Company, 1975–1991
 Joseph H. Moglia (1967) – CEO of TD Ameritrade
 William J. Moore (1936) - attorney, Fordham University School of Law Dean of Admissions
 John J. Murphy (1925) – New York Yankees pitcher who appeared in eight World Series games
 SSgt. Robert C. Murray (1964) - Medal of Honor recipient
 John J. F. Mulcahy (1891) – Olympic medalist in rowing, politician
 Rafael Novoa (1985) - former professional baseball player
 Bill O'Donnell (1943) – sports announcer for the Baltimore Orioles
 Lester W. Patterson (1911) - lawyer, politician, and judge
 Louis A. Perrotta (1920) - surgeon, Metropolitan Opera house physician
 Frank J. Petrilli (1968) –  former president and CEO of American Express Centurion Bank; former president and CEO of TD Waterhouse; former CEO of  E-Trade
 Vincent Richards (1920) – Olympic medalist in tennis 
 Norbert Sander (1960) – physician; runner who was the first male New Yorker to win the New York City Marathon in 1974; founder of the Fort Washington Avenue Armory Foundation

 Vin Scully (1944) – sports announcer for the Los Angeles Dodgers; Ford C. Frick Award honoree; Radio Hall of Fame inductee   
 Robert Gould Shaw (ex-1854, did not graduate) – commanding officer of the 54th Massachusetts Regiment, the first all African-American regiment during the American Civil War; portrayed by Matthew Broderick in the 1989 movie Glory
 George Stirnweiss (1936) – professional baseball player for the New York Yankees; American League batting champion in 1945 
 Andrew Velazquez (2012) – professional baseball player 
 Donnie Walsh (1958) – president of basketball operations for the New York Knicks; former general manager for the Indiana Pacers
 Edward J. Walsh (1908) - lawyer and politician
 Malcolm Wilson (1929) – Lieutenant Governor of New York; Governor of New York 
 Rev. Victor R. Yanitelli, SJ (1933) – former president of Saint Peter's University
 Cameron Young (2015) – professional golfer

Notable faculty 
 Timothy Healy, S.J.; Faculty 1950s
 John Cardinal McCloskey; Rector of Fordham 1841-1843
 Martin Joseph Neylon, S.J.; Faculty 1944-1946
 William O'Malley, S.J.; Faculty 1986-2012
 Heiner Wilmer, S.C.J.; Faculty 1997-1998

Notable Trustees

See also
 List of Jesuit sites

References

External links

 

Boys' schools in New York City
Educational institutions established in 1841
1841 establishments in New York (state)
Jesuit high schools in the United States
Preparatory School
Preparatory schools in New York (state)
Preparatory schools in New York City